This is a list of by-elections for Czech Senate.

 
Czech Senate
Senate by-elections